The Council on Foundations, founded in 1949, is a nonprofit leadership association of grantmaking foundations and corporations. The Council's mission is to provide the opportunity, leadership, and tools needed by philanthropic organizations to expand, enhance, and sustain their ability to advance the common good.  Its vision is as a strategic leader that raises issues of shared interest, expands the thinking about our field, builds collaborative efforts, and breaks down barriers that stand in the way of effective and dynamic philanthropy.

The Council is led by Kathleen P. Enright as its President and CEO and Javier Soto as the Chairman of the Board of Directors.

See also
Private foundation
Community foundation

References

External links 
 Council on Foundations website

Foundations based in the United States